Motahhar-e Sofla (also Romanized as Moţahhar-e Soflá; also known as Moţahharābād-e Pā‘īn) is a village in Dabuy-ye Jonubi Rural District, Dabudasht District, Amol County, Mazandaran Province, Iran. At the 2006 census, its population was 324, in 91 families.

References 

Populated places in Amol County